Short U (Ў ў; italics: Ў ў) is a letter of the Cyrillic script. The only Slavic language using this letter in its orthography is Belarusian, though it is used as a phonetic symbol in some Russian and Ukrainian dictionaries. Among the non-Slavic languages using Cyrillic alphabets, ў is used in Dungan, Karakalpak, Karachay-Balkar, Mansi, Sakhalin Nivkh, Ossetian and Siberian Yupik. It is also used in Uzbek – this letter corresponds to Oʻ in the Uzbek Latin alphabet.

Short U
The letter originates from the letter izhitsa  with a breve (etc.) used in certain Ukrainian books at the end of the 16th and the beginning of the 17th centuries. Later, this character was probably in use in the Romanian Cyrillic script, from where it was borrowed in 1836 by the compilers of Ukrainian poetry book Rusalka Dnistrovaja. The book's foreword reads “we have accepted Serbian џ … and Wallachian [Romanian] ў …”. In this book,  is used mostly for etymological [l] transformed to [w].  Modern Ukrainian spelling uses  (v) in that position.

For Belarusian, the combination of the Cyrillic letter U with a breve  was proposed by P.A. Bessonov in 1870. Before that, various ad hoc adaptations of the Latin U were used, for example, italicized in some publications of Vintsent Dunin-Martsinkyevich, with acute accent  in Jan Czeczot's Da milykh mužyczkoú (To dear peasants, 1846 edition), W with breve  in Epimakh-Shypila, 1889, or just the letter  itself (like in publications of Konstanty Kalinowski, 1862–1863). A U with haček  was also used.

After 1870, both the distinction for the phoneme and the new shape of the letter still were not consistently used until the mid-1900s for technical problems, per Bulyka. Among the first publications using it were folklore collections published by Michał Federowski and the first edition of Francišak Bahuševič's Dudka Biełaruskaja (Belarusian flute, published in Kraków, 1891). For quite a while other kinds of renderings (plain , or with added accent, haček, or caret) were still being used, sometimes within a single publication (Bahushevich, 1891, Pachobka, 1915), also supposedly because of technical problems.

Usage

Belarusian
The letter is called non-syllabic u or short u (Belarusian: у нескладовае, u nieskładovaje or у кароткае, u karotkaje) in Belarusian because although it resembles the vowel у (u), it does not form syllables.

Compare хлеў ( chleŭ, ‘shed’) with за хлявом ( za chlavóm, ‘behind the shed’). Also, when a word starts with an unstressed   and follows a word that ends in a vowel, it forms a diphthong through liaison and it is written with  instead. For example, у хляве ( u chlavié, ‘in the shed’) but увайшлі яны ў хлеў ( uvajšlí janý ŭ chleŭ, ‘they went into the shed’). According to the current official orthographic rules of 2008, proper names conserve the initial  in writing, so the capital letter  can occur only in all-capitals writing. Previous official orthographic rules (1959) also made exception for loanwords (каля універсітэта, ‘near the university’, now spelled каля ўніверсітэта). The unofficial 2005 standardization of Taraškievica allows the capital  in proper names. In acronyms/initialisms, the word-initial  becomes : ВНУ for вышэйшая навучальная ўстанова ‘higher education institution (university, college, institute)’. Also,  becomes  in name initials in Taraškievica.

The letter  is also sometimes used to represent the labial-velar approximant  in foreign loanwords: this usage is allowed by the 2005 standardization of Taraškievica. When it is used thus it can appear before non-iotified vowels, does not require a preceding vowel, and may be capital.

In this case, the capital  may also occur.

Uzbek
This letter is the 32nd letter of the Uzbek Cyrillic alphabet. It corresponds to Oʻ in the current Uzbek alphabet. It is different from the regular O, which is represented by the Cyrillic letter О.

Karakalpak 
The letter is the 26th letter in the Karakalpak alphabet. It corresponds to the sound /w/ and the Latin letter W.

In culture

In September 2003, during the tenth Days of Belarusian Literacy celebrations, the authorities in Polatsk, the oldest Belarusian city, made a monument to honor the unique Cyrillic Belarusian letter . The original idea for the monument came from professor Paval Siemčanka, a scholar of Cyrillic calligraphy and type.

The letter  is also the namesake of Ў gallery, an art gallery in Minsk between 2009–2020.

Computing codes

See also
Breve
Й й : Short I
Ŭ ŭ : Latin letter Ŭ - an Esperanto letter.
W w : Latin letter W
Ԝ ԝ : Cyrillic letter Ԝe

Notes

External links

U